Ortayol is a village in the Pazar District, Rize Province, in Black Sea Region of Turkey. Its population is 147 (2021).

History 
According to list of villages in Laz language book (2009), name of the village is Meleskur, which means "opposing valley". Most villagers are ethnically Hemshin.

Geography

References

Villages in Pazar District, Rize